Admiral (Adm) (Am) is a four-star commissioned naval officer rank in the Swedish Navy. Admiral ranks immediately above vice admiral and is equivalent to general.

History
In Sweden, the admiral's rank first appeared during the reign of Gustav I, who in 1522 gave it to Erik Fleming, a Council of the Realm. The first permanent  was appointed in 1575; his office ceased in 1619. Vice admiral is first mentioned in 1577.

Admiral is equivalent to the rank of general in the Swedish Army, the Swedish Air Force, the Swedish Coastal Artillery (until 2000) and as well as in the Swedish Amphibious Corps (from 2000). Historically, during the 20th century, vice admirals were promoted one grade upon retirement to full four-star admiral. The last time this happened was in 1991 when vice admiral Bror Stefenson was promoted to admiral in connection with his retirement from the navy. According to current practice only royals and the Supreme Commander of the Swedish Armed Forces, if he were to come from the Swedish Navy, can hold the rank of a full, four-star, admiral in Sweden.

Following a proposal from the Swedish Armed Forces, the Government of Sweden decides on employment as an admiral.

In everyday speech, admirals of all ranks are addressed as admirals.

Uniform

Shoulder mark
The shoulder mark of a Swedish admiral contains a 45 mm galloon m/51 and four 25 mm star m/30 in silver embroidery on a white background: The center distance between the stars on the shoulder mark must be 27 mm.

Sleeve insignia
A flag officer wears on the sleeves a 45 mm galloon (GALON M/51 45MM K) and a rank insignia (GRADBETECKNING M/02 TILL ÄRM FLOTTAN) (round loop, the Amphibious Corps has a pointed loop in form of a grenade).

Hats

Peaked cap
A flag officer wears as embellishments a gold embroidered oak leaf wreath (known as scrambled egg) on the visor of the peaked cap (skärmmössa m/48). It also fitted with a hat badge (mössmärke m/78 off för flottan) and with a strap in form of a golden braid.

Side cap and winter hat
An officer wears a hat badge (mössmärke m/78 off) for the navy and another (mössmärke m/87 off) for amphibious units on the side cap (båtmössa m/48) and on the winter hat (vintermössa m/87).

Personal flags
Admiral's command flag, which admirals of all ranks carry on ships, where they are as commanders. On a three-masted ship, an admiral's flag flies on top of the main mast (vice admiral's flies on the top of the fore-mast and rear admiral's on top of the mizzen-mast). The command flag of an admiral (and a general) is a double swallowtailed Swedish flag. In the first blue field 4 five-pointed white stars placed two over two (before 1972 by 3 stars placed one over two).

The flag of the admiral (and vice admiral and rear admiral) is flown on ships of the navy, from which officer of the rank now mentioned exercises his command, or on which he travels in the service, but not on ships on which he is in the capacity of exercise leader.

A flag officer (for example an admiral) who holds the position of Supreme Commander, Chief of Operations, Chief of Navy, Chief of Maritime Component Command or naval force commander, may carry an admiral flag on a car in which the commander in question travels in uniform. On airplanes/helicopters, vice admirals (flag officers) may carry a command sign in the form of an image of an admiral flag.

Gun salute
When raising or lowering flags of the commander's, squadron, department or division commander, a gun salute is given with 17 rounds for admiral (15 for vice admiral and 13 for rear admiral).

List of admirals
Ivar Fleming 1534
Jakob Bagge 1555
Nils Jespersson Kruse 1563
Klas Kristersson Horn af Åminne 1564
Bengt Halstensson Bagge 1569
Herman Fleming 1574
Hans Claësson Bjelkenstjerna 1611
Clas Fleming 1620
Nils Göransson Stiernsköld 1627
Åke Ulfsparre 1640
Mårten Anckarhielm 1653
Göran Göransson Gyllenstierna the elder 1640
Klas Hansson Bjelkenstjerna 1654
Sten Nilsson Bielke 1657
Claes Nilsson Stiernsköld 1661
Claes Uggla 1670
Erik Carlsson Sjöblad 1676
Hans Clerck 1676
Johan Bär 1676
Johan Olofsson Bergenstierna 1676
Gustaf Adolph Sparre 1690
Cornelius Anckarstjerna 1692
Evert Fredrik Taube 1700
Jacob De Prou 1709
Axel Johan Lewenhaupt 1712
Gustaf Wattrang 1712
Erik Johan Lillie 1715
Gustaf von Psilander 1715
Mikael Henck 1715
Carl Henrik von Löwe 1719
Jonas Fredrik Örnfelt 1719
Olof Strömstierna 1719
Nils Ehrenschiöld 1721
Olof von Unge 1734
Gustaf Grubbe 1736
Jean von Utfall 1742
Theodor Ankarcrona 1742
Abraham Falkengréen 1749
Carl Hans Sparre 1754
Erik Arvid Sparre 1755
Didrik Henrik Taube 1768
Nils Lillienanckar 1771
Carl Vilhelm Modée 1793
Salomon von Rajalin 1809
Henrik Johan Nauckhoff 1817
Magnus Palmqvist 1818
Per Gustaf Lagerstråle 1818
Carl Fredrik Coyet 1827
Johan Lagerbielke 1827
Otto Gustaf Nordensköld 1845
Johan Henrik Kreüger 1857
Carl August Gyllengranat 1858
Carl Magnus Ehnemark 1862
Christian Anders Sundin 1884
Carl Gustaf von Otter 1889
Louis Palander af Vega 1900
Fredrik von Otter 1900
Hjalmar af Klintberg 1903
King Gustav V 1907
Carl Hjulhammar 1911
Wilhelm Dyrssen 1923
Carl August Ehrensvärd 1926
Henning von Krusenstierna 1927
Otto Lybeck 1936
Fabian Tamm 1947
King Gustaf VI Adolf 1950
Stig H:son Ericson 1961
The Duke of Halland 1969
Åke Lindemalm 1970
King Carl XVI Gustaf 1973
Bengt Lundvall 1978
Bror Stefenson 1991

See also
 List of admirals of Sweden
 Military ranks of the Swedish Armed Forces

Footnotes

References

Notes

Print

 
Four-star officers
Military ranks of the Swedish Navy